Legacy Audio is a manufacturer of high-end audio equipment. The company produces components, passive (Focus SE) loudspeakers, and active (Focus XE) powered speakers.

Legacy Audio and its founder, Bill Dudleston, have been cited in publications such as Billboard, The Wall Street Journal, Stereophile, The Absolute Sound, Home Theater Magazine, and the Robb Report.

Legacy has produced speakers for Arista, Sony, Universal Music Group, and archival organizations such as the Stradivari Violin Society. Multi-Grammy award-winning producers Rick Rubin and L.A. Reid, and renowned mastering engineer Herb Powers, have utilized the Legacy designs as assisting in producing artists Sheryl Crow, Johnny Cash, Tom Petty, Red Hot Chili Peppers, Mariah Carey, and Usher.  Re-mastering engineer Steve Hoffman has utilized the Legacy speakers on re-issues of Elvis Presley, Frank Sinatra and Nat King Cole.

References

External links
Legacy Audio

Companies established in 1983
Companies based in Sangamon County, Illinois
Loudspeaker manufacturers
Springfield, Illinois
Audio equipment manufacturers of the United States